This is a list of producers, writers and directors that have worked on the ABC Daytime drama General Hospital.

Current main crew
 Executive producer: Frank Valentini
 Producers: Michelle Henry (senior producer), Mary-Kelly Weir (senior producer), Jennifer Whittaker-Brogdon (producer), Nneka Garland (coordinating producer), Jeffrey Sierks (associate producer)
 Directors: Larry Carpenter, Tina Keller, William Ludel, Gary Tomlin, Frank Valentini, Denise Van Cleave, Phideaux Xavier
 Associate directors: Teresa Cicala, Peter Fillmore, Paul Glass, Marika Kushel, Dave MacLeod, Christine Magarian Ucar, Allison Reames Smith, Kyle Bell (stage manager), Rob Markham (stage manager), Craig McManus (stage manager), Jillian Dedote (production associate), Nate Hapke (production associate)
 Head writers: Dan O'Connor and Chris Van Etten
 Associate head writer: Anna Theresa Cascio
 Breakdown writers: Ashley D. Cook, Suzanne Flynn, Lloyd Gold, Shannon Peace, Elizabeth Korte
 Script writers: Charlotte Gibson, Kate Hall, Lisa Seidman, Dave Rupel, Scott Sickles
 Casting director: Mark Teschner, Lisa Booth (casting associate)
Lighting directors: Bob Bessoir, Melanie Mohr, Vincent Steib

Executive producers

Head writers

Past writers

Lisa Lieberman - 1996 
Lynda Myles - 1996 
Michael Quinn - 1998-1999 
Victor Miller - 2002 
Sheri Anderson - 1979-1992 
Patricia Falken Smith - 1979-1981 
James E. Reilly - 1985-1988 
Linda Schreyer - 1991-1993 
Richard J. Allen - 1992-1993 
Dana Coen - 1993 
David Rupel - 1998-2001, 2016–2017
Stephen Demorest - 1998-1999 
Christopher Dunn
Susan Goldberg
Craig Heller
Christiana Miller
Royal Miller
Dwight D. Smith
Anne Snyder
Ron Carlivati 2012–2015
James Fryman 2001-2003
Ralph Ellis 1993-1996 
Mary Ryan 1996-1999 
Michael J. Cinquemani 2003-2005 
Michele Val Jean 1993–2012
Karen Harris 1993–1997, 2005–2011
Michael Conforti 2001–2012
Garin Wolf 1997–2012
Matthew Labine 1993-1996 
Gillian Spencer 1993-2001 
Patrick Mulcahey 1996-1999 
Doris Silverton 1984-1993 
Linda Campanelli
Jean Passanante 2012–2017
Christopher Whitesell 1997, 2015–2017

Past directors

Joseph Behar 1963, 1996-2006
Ken Herman 1965-1977
Phil Sogard 1981-1993
Alan Pultz 1981-1998
Marlena Laird 1984-1992
Jerry Evans 1991-1992
Peter Brinckerhoff 1993-2010
Carol Scott 1998-2001
Andrew Lee 2000-2003
Mary Madeiras 2001-2003, 2006
David Forsyth 2002-2006
Anthony Morina 2002-2006
Owen Renfroe 2001–2012
Scott McKinsey 1992-2020
.  Shelley Curtis 1993-2001

References

American soap opera writers

General Hospital
Soap opera producers